The South Island rugby league team is a rugby league team that represents the South Island of New Zealand. They are nicknamed the Scorpions. The side previously represented the Southern Zone in the Albert Baskerville Trophy. However, they now only compete in the under 15 and under 17 National Competitions. Historically, teams representing the South Island played annual fixtures against the North Island and also played touring international sides.

Touring Teams
The South Island last played an international side when they played France in 2001, losing 24–18. The team included Robert Henare and Aaron Whittaker.

Inter island matches

1925

1926

1927

1928

1929
Len Scott was injured during the match and replaced by Allan Seagar for the North Island while for the South Island Sanders was injured and replaced by Doogan. In past years the North Island team was dominated by players from the Auckland competition however the North Island team on this occasion featured players from outside Auckland such as Ted Meyer, Dick Trautvetter, Bob Stephenson, Joe Menzies, Tom Timms, and T Bergan.

1930 
For the North Island v South Island trial the Devonport and Ponsonby clubs gave permission for their jerseys to be worn by the respective sides. Mick O’Brien of the South Island team broke his tibia late in the match.

1931

1932 
Jim Amos left the field with an injured shoulder for the South Island team and was replaced by E O'Brien.

Not Played

1934

1935
This was the 10th inter-island match stretching back to 1925. The North Island had won 7, the South Island had won 1 in 1929, with a draw in 1930. Roy Bright, Wilf Hassan and McNeil (Richmond) were selected to play for the North Island but were unavailable. The North Island had 3 players debuting, Bill Telford, Ted Mincham, and W. Large (Hawke's Bay).

1936
During the match R Haslam was running with the ball when he began falling into a hole which had fallen into the ground. In the meantime he had passed the ball and play moved away but was forced to stop once the referee realised what had happened. It had formed near a drain where the water had washed away the soil beneath the ground. A ball boy was photographed standing in the hole ‘buried’ to his waist. The gate receipts for the match were £608 19/ with 15,000 in attendance at the match and the trial curtain-raiser.

Not played

1938
Brian Riley was initially named to play for the North Island side but as he was unable to get leave from work to potentially tour Australia if selected he was replaced in the North Island side.

1939
Wally Tittleton was chosen as the North Island captain while Rex King captained the South Island.

1940-43 Not Played

1944
This was the first time since 1939 that the North Island v South Island match had been played. The North Island won comfortably scoring 9 tries to 3. The North Island side featured 10 players from the Auckland competition.

References

External links
Southern Region NZRL.co.nz

New Zealand rugby league teams
Rugby league in the South Island